XHGF-FM is a radio station on 97.3 FM in Gutiérrez Zamora, Veracruz. It is known as La Ley FM with a grupera format.

History
XEGF-AM 1420 received its concession on June 29, 1961. It was owned by María Elena Barriga García and broadcast with 500 watts day and 100 night. By the late 1960s, it was owned by Luz María Musset de Castro, who moved it to 1020 kHz by the 1980s. In the 1990s, it moved to 740 and doubled its daytime power.

XEGF was authorized to move to FM in November 2010.

References

Radio stations in Veracruz